The San Marino national baseball team is the national baseball team of San Marino. The team competes in the biennial European Baseball Championship.

Placings
European Baseball Championship
 1971 : 5th
 1985 : 6th

Baseball in San Marino
National baseball teams in Europe
Baseball